Ryan Monro (born 26 July 1981) is an Australian bassist, known for playing with Australian ska/jazz band The Cat Empire. He has been the bassist for The Cat Empire since its inception and also plays in jazz trio "The Genie", which includes fellow Cat Empire members, Ollie McGill on keyboards and Will Hull Brown on drums. His cousin is Shaun Taylor, a farmer, and chef.

Monro originally started playing guitar in grade 9 at Frankston High School but soon moved to electric bass. He later picked up double bass and after graduating from high school, attended the Victorian College of Arts. 
In late 1999, Monro met and began playing in a trio with Ollie McGill on keyboards and Felix Riebl on percussion and vocals. Calling themselves "The Cat Empire", they started playing a wide variety of gigs in clubs like Dizzy's and Bennett's Lane in Melbourne. The band soon expanded in 2001 adding Harry James Angus on trumpet, Will Hull-Brown on drums and Jamshid "Jumps" Khadiwala as a DJ. With the band, he released eight studio albums. It was announced in March 2021 that Monro was retiring from the band. He was scheduled to play his last show at the Sidney Myer Music Bowl on 6 March 2021, however he rejoined the band to play their final Melbourne shows in December 2021. He played his final show with the band on 16 December 2021. Since 2021, he has played bass for Melbourne band The Meltdown.

He created a recording of Telstra's speaking clock before it went offline in 2019 and used the recording for a new website, .

References

External links
 Official Website

1981 births
Living people
Australian bass guitarists
Australian double-bassists
Male double-bassists
21st-century double-bassists
21st-century bass guitarists
21st-century Australian male musicians
21st-century Australian musicians
The Cat Empire members
Australian male guitarists
Victorian College of the Arts alumni
Musicians from Melbourne